Toyota Motor Manufacturing West Virginia (TMMWV) is a Toyota Motor Corporation factory in Buffalo, West Virginia. It is a subsidiary of Toyota Motor North America, itself a subsidiary of Toyota Motor Corporation of Japan. The plant solely builds engines and transmissions; no vehicles are produced at this facility.

In February 2021, Toyota Motor Corp announced it would invest $210 million to expand engine production in West Virginia and add 100 new jobs.

The Japanese automaker said it would boost capacity by 70,000 engines a year at the Buffalo, West Virginia plant, up from the nearly 1 million transmissions and engines it produces annually for vehicles assembled in North America.

Engines Produced 

 2GR-FKS V6 (2016-present) for Tacoma
 2ZR-FE I4 (2007-2022) for Corolla
 A25A-FXS I4 (2018–present) for Highlander, RAV4 and Sienna

Former Engines Produced 
 Toyota 3MZ-FE V6 for Sienna, Camry Solara and Lexus RX 330 (2004–2008)
 Toyota 1ZZ-FE I4 for Toyota Corolla, Toyota Matrix, and Pontiac Vibe
Toyota 2GR-FE V6 for Toyota Sienna, Lexus RX350, Toyota Highlander
Toyota T24A-FKS I4 Turbo

Drivetrain Production 
 Automatic transmissions – The plant produces automatic transaxles for Toyota passenger vehicles
Current:
8-speed automatic transmission for Toyota Camry, Toyota Highlander, Toyota Avalon, Lexus ES
HSD Motor Generator for Toyota Hybrid Vehicles

Previous:
6-speed automatic transmission for Toyota Avalon, Toyota RAV4, Toyota Highlander, Toyota Sienna
5-speed automatic transmissions for the Toyota Camry, Solara, Sienna and Lexus RX 330 ended in 2011
4-speed production ended in 2004

References 

Toyota factories
Motor vehicle assembly plants in West Virginia
Buildings and structures in Putnam County, West Virginia